Juan de Dios Ramírez Perales, dubbed "El Capi" (born 8 March 1969) is a Mexican former professional footballer who played as a defender.

Ramírez Perales played for nearly 15 years in Mexico's league top tier, beginning his career with UNAM in 1988. By the following year he had become a starter in central defense, and he started 41 matches in 1990–91 as Pumas won the league, overcoming Club América in the final. He remained with UNAM until 1994, then joined Monterrey for one season and Toros Neza for another before moving to Atlante for the Invierno 1996 season. Playing alongside Romanian Miodrag Belodedici, Ramírez Perales helped form a strong central defensive pairing, but Atlante's seasons during this time repeatedly ended in disappointment in the knockout Liguilla phase. Leaving Atlante in 2000, he represented Chivas, Irapuato, and Veracruz in the closing years of his career.

At international level, he earned 49 caps for the Mexico national team between 1991 and 1995. Ramírez Perales made his international debut against the United States on 12 March 1991. Under César Luis Menotti and then Miguel Mejía Baron, he became a starter for the national team throughout World Cup qualifying and the 1993 Copa América, in which he played every minute of Mexico's six matches on the way to the final. Likewise, Ramírez Perales started all four games at the 1994 FIFA World Cup, lining up next to Claudio Suárez in the heart of the Mexico defense. He was recalled for the 1995 Copa América, but only appeared in the opening game. Ramírez Perales earned his final cap on 6 July 1995 in a 2–1 loss against Paraguay, and was replaced by Manuel Vidrio in central defense for Mexico's remaining matches in the competition.

In addition, Ramírez Perales played three games for Mexico at the 1985 FIFA U-16 World Championship in China.

External links

playerhistory 

1969 births
Living people
1994 FIFA World Cup players
1993 Copa América players
1995 Copa América players
CONCACAF Gold Cup-winning players
Footballers from Mexico City
Association football defenders
Mexico international footballers
Club Universidad Nacional footballers
C.D. Guadalajara footballers
C.F. Monterrey players
Atlante F.C. footballers
Irapuato F.C. footballers
C.D. Veracruz footballers
Toros Neza footballers
Liga MX players
Mexican footballers
1993 CONCACAF Gold Cup players
Club León non-playing staff
Club Necaxa non-playing staff